Botai (Botai) is a village in Aiyrtau District, North Kazakhstan Region, Kazakhstan. Its KATO code is 593246200.

The village gives its name to a nearby archaeological site, the type site of the Botai culture, which dates to the Eneolithic period ( 3500 BCE) and has produced some of the earliest evidence for the domestication of the horse.

References

Populated places in North Kazakhstan Region